Thomas James Maling (15 July 1778 – 22 January 1849) was a Royal Navy officer, a captain during Napoleonic Wars and later promoted to Rear-Admiral.

Biography
He was the son of Christopher Thompson Maling, DL, of Worcestershire, and scion of the Maling pottery family, and his second wife, Martha Sophia Sheels.

Commissioned into the Royal Navy in 1791, he was promoted to Lieutenant in 1797, Commander in 1798, Captain in 1800,  and Rear-Admiral in 1830.

He commanded Mulgrave during the action of 5 November 1813.

He married Harriet Darwin, daughter of the poet and physician Erasmus Darwin and his second wife, Elizabeth Colyear, illegitimate daughter of Charles Colyear, 2nd Earl of Portmore.  Harriet died in 1825 in Valparaiso, Chile, without issue.  In 1828 he was married again, to Jemima Bromley, daughter of Henry Bromley; they had four children, including a son of the same name:
 Elizabeth Anne Maling (1830–1866), noted horticulturist and author of several books on plant care. Married 1865 to Count de Vandalin Mniszeck, an Austrian noble. 
 Jemima Maling (1834–?)
Thomas James Maling (1836–1922), New Zealand importer and merchant
 Emma Maling (1838–?)

He died in 1849, survived by his wife, who lived until 1857.

References

See also
 

1778 births
1849 deaths
Royal Navy officers
British naval commanders of the Napoleonic Wars